Cuby + Blizzards, also known as Cuby & the Blizzards, were a Dutch blues group, founded in 1964 by vocalist Harry Muskee and guitarist Eelco Gelling. During the 1960s, the band's mixture of sound, drawing upon a variety of genres which included blues and rock and roll, gave them a pioneering sound which was completely different from any other Dutch band in the same period. The spelling of the name varies, with 'Cuby' also written as 'QB' and the ampersand (&) also written as 'and' or '+' and the 'and' sometimes left out. The spelling 'Cuby + Blizzards' was used on the first albums.

Career
Cuby + Blizzards originated from Drenthe Grolloo with members Harry Muskee (whose dog was called Cuby), Eelco Gelling, Nico Schröder and Hans Kinds.
The band's first single, a blues-based track bearing similarities to The Pretty Things output, was "Stumble and Fall" in 1965. They had their first top 40 hit with "Back Home" in the Netherlands 1966. In 1967 they toured with Van Morrison (after he had left Them), recorded an album, Praise the Blues with U.S. blues musician Eddie Boyd and scored a top 10 hit with "Window of My Eyes". That year, John Mayall stayed at their farm and the next year they regularly played with the 'king of British blues' Alexis Korner, who is featured on their album Live in Düsseldorf (1968). 

The line-up of the band changed regularly, but founders Harry Muskee and Eelco Gelling remained at the core of the band until 1976. Herman Brood was the pianist from early 1967 until mid-1969 (which kickstarted his career) and again in 1976. Also in 1976, Gelling left to join Golden Earring. Muskee then decided to drop the name C+B and to form the Harry Muskee Band. This band recorded one album before Muskee decided to leave the music business. In 1980 he formed the Muskee Gang with a line-up of Herman Deinum (bass guitar) and Hans la Faille (drums), who had both joined C+B in 1969, together with saxophonist Rudy van Dijk, Paul Smeenk (guitar) and Jeff Reynolds (trumpet). 

Among the best known songs released by the band were "Another Day, Another Road", "Distant Smile", "Window Of My Eyes" and "Appleknockers Flophouse".

In 1996 Cuby + Blizzards re-formed without Eelco Gelling, who was replaced by Erwin Java on guitar. In 2004 they went on a theater tour to honor John Lee Hooker. C+B came to an end when Harry Muskee died of cancer on 26 September 2011.

The band received an Edison award for their debut album Desolation. The song "Window of My Eyes" (a Top 10 hit in The Netherlands in 1968), was featured over the ending credits for the 2010 film The American.

Line-ups

 Early line-up
 Harry "Cuby" Muskee, vocals
 Eelco Gelling, guitar
 Hans Kinds, guitar (replaced by Herman Brood, piano)
 Willy Middel, bass (replaced by Jaap van Eik)
 Hans Waterman, drums (replaced by Dick Beekman)

 Late sixties line-up
 Harry Muskee, vocals
 Eelco Gelling, guitar
 Herman Deinum, bass guitar
 Hans la Faille, drums
 Helmig van der Vegt, piano

 1983 – line-up
 Harry Muskee, vocals
 Rudy Van Dijk, tenor sax
 Paul Smeenk, guitar
 Herman Deinum, bass
 Hans Lafaille, drums
 Jeff Reynolds, trumpet

 Reunion line-up 1996-2011
 Harry Muskee, vocals
 Erwin Java, guitar
 Herman Deinum, bass guitar
 Hans la Faille, drums
 Helmig van der Vegt, piano

Albums

References

External links
 Official site of Cuby + Blizzards
 Harry Muskee (Cuby)'s Official site
 Full Cuby & the Blizzards Discography
 Eelco's Official site

Musical groups established in 1964
Musical groups disestablished in 2011
Dutch blues musical groups
Nederpop
Herman Brood
1964 establishments in the Netherlands
2011 disestablishments in the Netherlands